Higham railway station may refer to a number of stations in the United Kingdom.

 Higham railway station (Kent), an open station on the North Kent Line
 Higham railway station (Suffolk), former station on the Ipswich to Ely Line
 Higham on the Hill railway station, former station on the Nuneaton to Ashby line